Jack William Ady (September 22, 1932 – November 26, 2019) was a provincial-level politician from Alberta, Canada. He served as a member of the Legislative Assembly of Alberta from 1986 to 1997. He was born in Cardston, Alberta.

Political career
Ady was elected to the Alberta Legislature in the 1986 Alberta general election. He won the electoral district of Cardston by a comfortable margin to hold the district for the Progressive Conservatives defeating three other candidates. He was re-elected to his second term in the 1989 Alberta general election. He defeated two other candidates in a landslide. Premier Ralph Klein appointed Ady as the Minister of Advanced Education and Technology and Career Development in 1992, he held that post until he left office in 1997.

In 2008 the Alberta government disbanded the existing health care boards and created one single provincial board. It was titled the Alberta Health Services Board. Ady was appointed to the new 15 member board, where he served until August 31, 2010.

The riding of Cardston was abolished due to redistribution for the 1993 Alberta general election. Ady ran for re-election in the new electoral district of Cardston-Chief Mountain. He won that district by slightly reduced plurality defeating two other candidates.

Ady did not run for a fourth term and retired at dissolution of the Assembly in 1997. His daughter in law Cindy Ady was the MLA for the electoral district of Calgary Shaw from 2001 to 2012.

Ady is a father of five children: Donald, Jack (Douglas), Lori, John, and Robert.

Late life
After leaving political office, Ady joined the Mount Royal College Board of Governors in 2000. A year later, on August 21, 2001, Minister of Learning Lyle Oberg appointed him as Chair the Board. He died on November 26, 2019.

References

External links
Legislative Assembly of Alberta Members Listing

1932 births
2019 deaths
Canadian Latter Day Saints
Members of the Executive Council of Alberta
People from Cardston
Progressive Conservative Association of Alberta MLAs
20th-century Canadian legislators